The October 2017 Vietnam tropical depression, also known officially by its designation as Tropical Depression 23W, was a weak but deadly system that brought torrential rainfall and extreme flooding over northern and central Vietnam in October 2017. The depression formed on October 7, located to the northwest of Luzon, Philippines. The system moved in a general westward direction as it steadily intensified. Despite being forecast to strengthen into a tropical storm, 23W failed to reach this intensity, due to lack of organization as it made landfall in Hà Tĩnh Province on October 10.

Meteorological history

The system had a broad low level circulation centre, while atmospheric convection associated with the system was displaced to the northeast of the centre. Over the next couple of days, the disturbance organised slightly, with atmospheric convection to the south of the disturbance improving as it moved westwards. During October 7, the Japan Meteorological Agency (JMA) reported that the disturbance had developed into a tropical depression, before the system passed over the Philippine island of Luzon.

By 10:00 UTC of October 8, the JTWC had issued a Tropical Cyclone Formation Alert, while the JMA had determined that the system had winds of 55 km/h (35 mph). Several hours later, the JTWC began issuing advisories and upgraded the system to a tropical depression, giving the designation of 23W. The JMA followed suit and began issuing advisories three hours later on October 9.

Preparations and impact

Vietnam

Despite being a weak system, 23W caused severe damage in many provinces across northern Vietnam. Rainfall of 100–150 mm (3.9–5.9 in) was recorded in the northern and central parts of the country, especially in the provinces of Nghệ An and Hà Tĩnh. Many hydroelectric dams and lakes had to be discharged and the Ministry of Industry and Trade established a working group to ensure the safety of 31 hydroelectric lakes. Heavy rainfall contributed to flash flooding, with five people swept away and an additional five injured in the district of Trạm Tấu, Yên Bái Province. Rescuers saved 28 people from the "danger zone". About 740 houses were flooded, with 30 ending up fully destroyed. The authorities mobilized some 2,200 people, including the military, police, Youth Union and civil defense offices, accompanied by a variety of means to search for missing victims, as well as support the people in the area. Moreover, the Red River was forecast to reach water levels of 3–50 cm (1.2–19.7 in).

On October 12, a landslide occurred in a district in Hòa Bình Province, burying four households. The number of flooded houses rose to 16,700. More than 39,300 hectares of crops were damaged along with two dikes. Around 1,200 cattle and roughly 40,000 fowl were either killed or swept away by flooding and landslides. Rainfall in Mai Châu District, Hoà Bình Province, reached 390 mm (15.3 in), while Kim Bôi District, Hoà Bình Province, had a total of 450 mm (17.7 in). In Lương Sơn District, Hoà Bình Province, 13 hectares of rice were damaged along with 97 hectares of other agriculture crops and 7 hectares of fruit trees. 6 km of roads and 4 km of canal were also damaged due to the flooding. The Vietnam Red Cross offered about 250 million ₫ (US$11 thousand) to families affected by a landslide in Phú Cường, Tân Lạc District, Hòa Bình Province.

Losses from damage in Yên Bái Province are estimated at 500 billion ₫ (US$22 million), while Sơn La Province had 59 billion ₫ (US$2.6 million) and Phú Thọ Province had 22.8 billion ₫ (US$1 million). Lương Sơn district, Hoà Bình Province, suffered damage of about 25 billion ₫ (US$1.1 million), and Lạc Sơn District, Hoà Bình Province, suffered damages of about 16 billion ₫ (US$704 thousand). Hoa Binh province had total damages of 46 billion ₫ (US$2.02 million), including 9 billion ₫ (US$396 thousand) from Ky Son. As of October 15, at least 68 people lost their lives; additionally, 30 were injured, and 34 are still missing. Almost half of the dead (26 people) were in Hoà Bình Province. In total, 100 people were killed and damages reached over 13 trillion ₫ (US$572 million).

Thailand
Despite making landfall in Vietnam, 23W triggered severe flooding in Thailand and killed a total of 9 people. As of October 19, damage from flooding estimated at US$30 million.

See also

Weather of 2017
Tropical cyclones in 2017
Tropical Depression 18W (2013)
Tropical Storm Aere (2016)
Tropical Storm Sonca (2017)
Tropical Storm Son-Tinh (2018)
Tropical Storm Linfa

References

External links

23W.TWENTYTHREE from the U.S. Naval Research Laboratory

2017 Pacific typhoon season
Typhoons in Vietnam
2017 disasters in Vietnam
October 2017 events in Asia
Western Pacific tropical depressions
23W
History of Nghệ An province
History of Hà Tĩnh Province
History of Thanh Hoá Province